The 1981 New South Wales Rugby Football League premiership was the 74th season of Sydney's professional rugby league football competition, Australia's first. Twelve clubs, including six of 1908's foundation teams and another six from around Sydney competed for the J J Giltinan Shield and WD & HO Wills Cup during the season, which culminated in a grand final between the Parramatta and Newtown clubs. NSWRFL clubs also competed in the 1981 Tooth Cup and players from NSWRFL clubs were selected to represent the New South Wales team.

Season summary
In 1981 the "sin-bin" was introduced to rugby league in Australia, enabling referees to send players from the field for five or ten minute periods for minor or deliberate technical offences. Newtown  Barry Jensen became the first player to be sent from the field in this manner.

Midway through the season, players contracted to NSWRFL clubs were selected to represent the New South Wales team in two games against the Queensland team in 1981. After that the experimental 1981 State of Origin game was played, and for the second time in history NSWRFL clubs' players were able to represent Queensland.

Twenty-two regular season rounds were played from March until August, resulting in a top five of Easts, Newtown, Parramatta, Cronulla and Manly who battled it out in the finals.

Eastern Suburbs' halfback Kevin Hastings won the 1981 season's Rothmans Medal as well as Rugby League Week's Player of the Year award. The Dally M Award went to Cronulla-Sutherland centre, Steve Rogers.

Teams
This was to be the final year that the NSWRFL premiership was an all-Sydney competition, with the introduction of teams from Canberra and Illawarra in 1982 starting a new era of expansion which would see the League transform into a national, then international competition.

Regular season

Bold – Home game
X – Bye
Opponent for round listed above margin

Ladder

Ladder progression

Numbers highlighted in green indicate that the team finished the round inside the top 5.
Numbers highlighted in blue indicates the team finished first on the ladder in that round.
Numbers highlighted in red indicates the team finished last place on the ladder in that round.
Underlined numbers indicate that the team had a bye during that round.

Finals
The elimination semi-final between Newtown and Manly-Warringah will always be remembered for the notorious all-in brawl, with the main combatants Newtown's Steve Bowden and Manly hardman Mark Broadhurst. Bowden was marched for the incident and was unable to take part in the preliminary final against Eastern Suburbs or the grand final against Parramatta.

Chart

Grand final

Newtown had reached their first grand final in twenty-six years. Parramatta led 7–6 at half-time, but the Jets looked set to spring a major upset when tough half back Tommy Raudonikis crashed over to score early in the second-half. Then the Eels' brilliant backline exploded into action. The combination of Brett Kenny, Mick Cronin, Peter Sterling, Eric Grothe and Steve Ella dominated and would go on to feature in five grand finals and four premierships by the end of 1986.

Steve Edge became the first player to captain two different sides to premiership victory having captained St. George to a win over the Eels in season 1977.

Master coach Jack Gibson had just six words for a packed Parramatta Leagues Club auditorium, who had just witnessed the Eels' first ever premiership since their 1947 entry to the competition. "Ding, dong, the witch is dead," he said before the thunderous chants of the success-starved blue and gold army of fans.

Parramatta 20 (Tries: Kenny 2, Atkins, Ella. Goals: Cronin 4.)

Newtown 11 (Tries: O'Grady, Hetherington, Raudonikis. Goal: Morris.)

Cumberland Oval
In the resultant celebrations at Parramatta with a large group of supporters having gathered at the Eels homeground of Cumberland Oval, subsequently lit a fire that burned the grandstand to the ground. In late 1984 a construction contract was signed by the NSW Government, with the new Parramatta Stadium being opened on 5 March 1986 by Queen Elizabeth II. Parramatta Stadium itself was knocked down along with the adjacent public pools, in 2017. The new stadium, the Western Sydney Stadium was opened on 14 April 2019.

Player statistics
The following statistics are as of the conclusion of Round 22.

Top 5 point scorers

Top 5 try scorers

Top 5 goal scorers

References

External links
 Rugby League Tables – Season 1981 
 1981 Grand final at eraofthebiff.com
Results:1981-90 at rabbitohs.com.au
1981 J J Giltinan Shield and WD & HO Wills Cup at rleague.com
NSWRFL season 1981 at rugbyleagueproject.com

New South Wales Rugby League premiership
NSWRFL season